Francesco Raffaello Santoro (1844, Cosenza – 1927, Rome) was an Italian painter. He was known for his work in landscapes and genre themes, both in oils and watercolors.

Life and work
He was born in Cosenza in Calabria, to a family of artists. His cousin was the painter, Rubens Santoro.

His first training was with his father who had founded a studio in Fuscaldo called Lithography Calabria which mainly made copies of sacred works and portraits. By 1865, Francesco had moved to Naples at the Royal Institute of Fine Arts.

He obtained a stipend from the Provincial Council of Cosenza to Study in Florence but, during 1864–1865, he travelled instead to England. In 1868, he obtained a stipend from the academy in Naples to study in Rome.

In 1885, he traveled again to Britain, and married a wealthy Scottish woman. Later, he returned to Rome to open a studio.

and other artists.

Santoro lived much of his life in Rome. In 1890 in Turin, he exhibited Il Medico dell'anima and Momento d' ozio. In Milan in 1881 Santoro exhibited Dopo il lavoro, Ricordo d'Amalfi, and Prima tappa. At the 1883 Exposition of Fine Arts in Rome, he displayed Pascariello e compagnia bella. At the same exposition a few years later, Santoro exhibitedIl pane quotidiano and Non so ochiù bonu!.

At the 1887 Venetian Mostra Artistica of Fine Arts, Santoro displayed: Dolce far niente. Finally, in 1888 in Bologna: Ricordo delle montagne di Carrara.

References

External links

 More works by Santoro @ ArtNet
 Francesco Raffaello Santoro in Italy

1844 births
1927 deaths
People from Cosenza
19th-century Italian painters
Italian male painters
20th-century Italian painters
19th-century Italian male artists
20th-century Italian male artists